Dr. George Jacobs (born 1952) is a well-known educator and vegan activist in Singapore.

Early life
Born in the United States in 1952
Jacobs went to Metuchen High School, Metuchen, New Jersey, United States

Career
1980: Bachelor of Arts, University of Illinois at Chicago, United States
1982: Master of Arts, University of Illinois at Chicago, United States
1991: Doctor of Philosophy (PhD), University of Hawaiʻi, United States
2003–2013; 2015– President, Vegetarian Society (Singapore)
1993–present: Teaching for Southeast Asian Ministers of Education Organization, Ministry of Education, Center for American Education, James Cook University Singapore

Personal life
Became Vegetarian in 1980, in recent years, George has switched to a vegan diet.
George is married with Dr. Fong Cheng Hong

Books (selection) and Publications (selection)
To date, George Jacobs has authored/co-authored the following books:

New Asian Traditions Vegetarian Cookbook,  by Amy, Susan; Kiran Narain & George Jacobs

The Heart Smart Oil Free Cookbook,  by Mayura Mohta & George Jacobs
Jacobs, G. M., Yeow, R., Lau, M., Loh, S., Chan, M., & Priyathanaa. (2013). Action research toolkit (ART). Singapore: Boys’ Town.

Jacobs, G. M., & Kimura, H. (2013). Cooperative learning and teaching. In the series, English language teacher development. Alexandria, VA: TESOL (Teachers of English to Speakers of Other Languages).

Jacobs, G. M., & Farrell, T. S. C. (2012). Teachers sourcebook for extensive reading. Charlotte, NC: Information Age Publishing.

Farrell, T. S. C., & Jacobs, G. M. (2010). Essentials for successful language teaching. New York, NY: Continuum.

Jacobs, G. M., & Goh, C. M. C. (2007). Cooperative learning in the language classroom. Singapore: SEAMEO Regional Language Centre.

McCafferty, S., Jacobs, G. M., & Iddings, C. (Eds.). (2006). Cooperative learning and second language teaching. New York: Cambridge University Press.
http://www.cambridge.org/catalogue/catalogue.asp?isbn=052184486X&ss=fro

Loh, W. I., & Jacobs, G. M. (2003). Nurturing the naturalist intelligence. San Clemente, CA: Kagan Publications.

Lie, A., Jacobs, G. M., & Amy, S. (Eds.). (2002). English via environmental education. Jakarta: Grasindo.

Rajan, S. B. R., Jacobs, G. M., Loh, W. I., & Ward, C. S. (2002). English in focus: A lower secondary guide. Singapore: Pearson Education.

Jacobs, G. M., Power, M. A., & Loh, W. I. (2002). The teacher's sourcebook for cooperative learning: Practical techniques, basic principles, and frequently asked questions. Thousand Oaks, CA: Corwin Press. http://www.corwinpress.com/booksProdDesc.nav?prodId=Book220803. Translated into Japanese (visit http://www.amazon.co.jp to order), Chinese and Korean

Loh, W. I., & Jacobs, G. M. (2002). Science made easy (Primary 4). Singapore: Longman.

Jacobs, G. M., & Loh, W. I. (2002). Grammar in use (Workbook 4). Singapore: Learners Publishing.

Jacobs, G. M., & Loh, W. I. (2002). Grammar in use (Workbook 3). Singapore: Learners Publishing.

Jacobs, G. M., & Loh, W. I. (2001). Grammar in use (Workbook 2). Singapore: Learners Publishing.

Jacobs, G. M., & Loh, W. I. (2001). Grammar in use (Workbook 1). Singapore: Learners Publishing.

Jacobs, G. M., & Loh, W. I. (2001). Read aloud Asia. Singapore: Times Media.

Loh, W. I., & Jacobs, G. M. (2001). Science made easy (Primary 3). Singapore: Longman.

Loh, W. I., & Jacobs, G. M. (2000). Little Sammy (a set of six preschool readers). Singapore: Singapore National Press.

Jacobs, G. M., & Loh, W. I. (2000). Little observers (a set of six preschool readers). Singapore: Singapore National Press.

Renandya, W. A., & Jacobs, G. M. (Eds.). (1998). Learners and language learning. Singapore: SEAMEO Regional Language Centre.

Jacobs, G. M., Kumarasamy, P., Nopparat, P., & Amy, S.  (1998). Linking language and the environment. Toronto: Pippin.

Jacobs, G. M., Gan, S. L., & Ball, J. (1997). Learning cooperative learning via cooperative learning: A sourcebook of lesson plans for teacher education. San Clemente, CA: Kagan Cooperative Learning. [Also translated into Chinese and Malay.]

Jacobs, G. M., Davis, C., & Renandya, W. A. (Eds.). (1997). Successful strategies for extensive reading. Singapore: SEAMEO Regional Language Centre.

Jacobs, G. M. (ed.). (1997). Language classrooms of tomorrow: Issues and responses. Singapore: SEAMEO Regional Language Centre.

Jacobs, G. M., & Sundara Rajan, B. R. (Eds.). (1996). Stories for language teacher education. Singapore: SEAMEO Regional Language Centre.

Hidalgo, A.C., Hall, D., & Jacobs, G. M. (Eds.). (1995). Getting started: Materials writers on materials writing. Singapore: SEAMEO Regional Language Centre.

Jacobs, G. M. (1993). Integrating environmental education in second language instruction. Singapore: SEAMEO Regional Language Centre.

Jacobs, G. M., & Power, M. A. (1991). Putting it all together. Ann Arbor, MI: University of Michigan Press.

And the following publications about him:
Personal interview with George Jacobs: "Going green for life" 
Interview with Dr. George Jacobs about the "controversy over cooperative learning".

See also
List of vegans
Vegetarian Society (Singapore)

References

1952 births
Living people
20th-century Singaporean educators
21st-century Singaporean educators
Metuchen High School alumni
Singaporean educators
Vegan cookbook writers
Veganism activists
University of Illinois Chicago alumni
University of Hawaiʻi at Mānoa alumni